The Great Defender is an American drama television series created by Frank Renzulli. The series stars Michael Rispoli, Peter Krause, Kelly Rutherford, Rhoda Gemignani and Richard Kiley. The series aired on Fox from March 5, 1995, to July 31, 1995.

Cast 
Michael Rispoli as Lou Frischetti 
Peter Krause as Crosby Caufield III 
Kelly Rutherford as Frankie Collett 
Rhoda Gemignani as Pearl Frischetti 
Richard Kiley as Jason DeWitt

Episodes

References

External links
 

1990s American drama television series
1995 American television series debuts
1995 American television series endings
English-language television shows
Fox Broadcasting Company original programming